Botswana's Ministry of Foreign Affairs is a department of the government of Botswana responsible for managing the country's diplomatic relations with other countries and international organizations. This mandate includes political, economic, and social/cultural relations.

Departments 

 Department of Protocol and Consular Services
 Department of Africa and the Middle East
 Department of Asia and Pacific Affairs
 Department of Multilateral Affairs
 Department of Public Relations, Research and Information
 Department of Europe and Americas
 Department of Corporate Services
 23 Missions (Embassies/High Commissions and Consulates) abroad: Pretoria, Johannesburg, Windhoek, Maputo, Harare, Lusaka, Nairobi, Addis Ababa, Kuwait, Canberra, New Delhi, Beijing, Tokyo, Brussels, Berlin, Stockholm, Geneva, London, Washington DC, New York, Abuja, Brasilia and Paris.

Foreign ministers of Botswana

References

Government ministries of Botswana
Botswana